Nick Brett (born 14 May 1974) is an English lawn and indoor bowler.

Bowls career
Brett bowls for the Huntingdon indoor bowls club and Brampton outdoor bowls club. He was ranked the indoor world number 1 in 2015 and 2016. and also won an outdoors National Title in 1999 and subsequent singles at the British Isles Bowls Championships in 2000.

Brett's greatest achievement before 2016 was winning the 2014 World Indoor Bowls Championship Pairs title partnering Greg Harlow. It was during the 2016 World Indoor Bowls Championship that Brett became the World Singles Champion for the first time beating Robert Paxton in a competitive final.

Brett followed up his 2016 success by winning the mixed pairs title at the 2017 World Indoor Bowls Championship with Claire Johnston of Scotland. He then joined an exclusive group of players who have won five or more world indoor titles after winning both the open pairs and mixed pairs at the 2020 World Indoor Bowls Championship and he narrowly failed to become the first player to win the treble after losing to Paxton in the open singles final. Other major indoor wins include the 2015 International Open and the 2013 and 2014 Scottish International Open.

In 2020, he was selected for the 2020 World Outdoor Bowls Championship in Australia. World ranked number one indoors he was unable to participate in the 2021 World Indoor Bowls Championship because he broke his arm following an accident playing golf.

In 2022, he competed in the men's triples and the men's fours at the 2022 Commonwealth Games. The team of Brett, Louis Ridout and Jamie Chestney won the triples gold medal and in the fours he also secured a bronze medal. The success during 2022 continued when he secured a second national title, winning the 2022 pairs with Lewis Baker.

At the 2023 World Indoor Bowls Championship, Brett won the Open Pairs with Greg Harlow again, defeating Jason Greenslade and Michael Stepney in the final. It was Brett's sixth title over all disciplines.

Personal life
Brett is a supervisor by trade and is married with two children. Due to injury in 2021 he was unable to compete in the World Indoor Championships and consequently joined the commentary team for the event.

References

External links
 
 

1974 births
Living people
English male bowls players
Indoor Bowls World Champions
Bowls European Champions
Commonwealth Games gold medallists for England
Commonwealth Games bronze medallists for England
Commonwealth Games medallists in lawn bowls
Bowls players at the 2022 Commonwealth Games
British sports broadcasters
Sports commentators
Sportspeople from Peterborough
21st-century English people
Medallists at the 2022 Commonwealth Games